Real-time marketing is marketing performed "on-the-fly" to determine an appropriate or optimal approach to a particular customer at a particular time and place. It is a form of market research inbound marketing that seeks the most appropriate offer for a given customer sales opportunity, reversing the traditional outbound marketing (or interruption marketing) which aims to acquire appropriate customers for a given 'pre-defined' offer. The dynamic 'just-in-time' decision making behind a real-time offer aims to exploit a given customer interaction defined by website clicks or verbal contact centre conversation.

History
Real-time marketing techniques developed during the mid-1990s following the initial deployment of customer relationship management (CRM) solutions in major retail banking, investment banking and telecommunications companies. The intrinsic and prevailing 'heavyweight' nature of the key CRM vendors at this time, who were generally focused on major back and front office system integration projects, provided an opportunity for niche players within the campaign management application arena.

Solution delivery 
The implementation of real-time marketing solutions through the late 1990s would typically involve a 10- to 14-week delivery project with 1-2 FTE expert consultants and often would follow an earlier outbound marketing solution implementation. This relatively lightweight delivery model had obvious appeal within the vendor sales cycle and customer procurement context but was ultimately to prove a disincentive for major systems integration services providers to partner with real-time marketing vendors.

Technical overview 
Real-time marketing solution implementation classically involves the server-side installation of a multithreaded core decisioning application server / interaction transactional-biased schema and supporting client components such as a fat-client desktop campaign studio / rules editor, browser-based marketing user reporting interface and enterprise application APIs such as web services / Java components. Vendors typically will also provide legacy interfaces for COM, sockets and HTTP integration.

Vendor solution approaches to real-time learning naturally vary but commonly, the underlying models utilize a naive Bayesian probability classifier, recognizing that despite their apparently oversimplified assumptions, these classifiers have worked well in many complex real-world situations. To help gain acceptance with in-house specialist data mining stakeholders, the real-time solutions also support external model scores and execution within offer decision making.

The dotcom 'bust' of 2000 inhibited the further development and implementation of item-based collaborative filtering techniques. Having been incorporated within real-time marketing solutions through the 1990s, these filtering techniques should have been immediately attractive to online retailers managing hundreds of thousands (or millions) of products as opposed to a retail bank with a hundred propositions across savings, credit card and mortgage product lines.

Marketing vision 
Over time, it became apparent to solution vendors and maturing customers alike that 'traditional' outbound and emergent inbound marketing initiatives should be consolidated within a coherent and coordinated enterprise marketing strategy. To this end, a class of marketing application known as marketing resource management (MRM) which 'sits above' real-time marketing, began to emerge during the early 21st Century, albeit in a fairly bespoke and implementation-specific guise. The essence of this abstraction layer is that the MRM application orchestrates strategy, stakeholder sign-off, budgeting, program planning, campaign execution and effectiveness reporting across inbound real-time and outbound marketing disciplines.

Unrealized promise 
The term "real-time marketing" has the potential weakness of self-limiting the underlying decisioning server capability to cross-sell and up-sell despite the observation that this particular function is generally the most compelling aspect of the application class. Vendors therefore found themselves re-branding real-time marketing products to suggest a more holistic appreciation of enterprise interaction decision management.

In some respects, these early real-time marketing customer implementations were ahead of their time despite acknowledged revenue realization within the early adopters.

Hosted real-time marketing solutions are an obvious and increasingly prevalent means of provisioning organizational demand for this critical enterprise capability. A remaining challenge for such solution vendors is to fully convince enterprise clients that the customer data profile (often comprising up to 1000 source or derived attributes) involved in the decision making and targeting processes is fully secure. Packaged 'private' cloud solutions are already appearing alongside 'cloud sourcing' management consultancies.

Gartner's predictions for the Gartner Top 10 Technologies for 2011 suggest that whatever the nomenclature, real-time marketing will continue to evolve, crucially to embrace mobile platforms underpinned by an awareness of customer context, location and social networking (collective intelligence) implications.

See also
 Haggling
 Predictive analytics
 Marketing automation
 Online marketing platform
 Public relations
 Viral marketing
 Mobile marketing

References

Marketing techniques